The Vodafone Challenge was a golf tournament on the Challenge Tour from 2006 to 2008. It was played at Golf & Country Club An der Elfrather Mühle in Düsseldorf, Germany.

In 2007, Joost Luiten shot an 11 under par 61 in the final round to win, which set the record for the lowest final round total by a winner of a Challenge Tour event.

Winners

External links
Coverage on the Challenge Tour's official site

Former Challenge Tour events
Golf tournaments in Germany